Primrose Path (also written as The Primrose Path) is a 1931 American drama film directed by William A. O'Connor and starring Helen Foster, John Darrow and Dorothy Granger.

Synopsis
The daughter of a policeman is led astray into a wild life by a star football player at her school, and ends up being expelled. Ashamed she runs away from home, and ends up being tricked into a brothel. She is rescued from it just in time by her former boyfriend, a young motorcycle policeman. Meanwhile the boy who led her astray dies in a violent car crash after fleeing the law.

Cast
 Helen Foster as Molly Malone
 John Darrow as Buck Randall
 Dorothy Granger as Rita Johnson
 Lane Chandler as Danny McGann
 DeWitt Jennings as Joe Malone
 Mary Carr as 	Grandmother
 Virginia Pearson as Marie Randeau
 Julia Swayne Gordon as Mrs. Randall

References

Bibliography
 Pitts, Michael R. Poverty Row Studios, 1929–1940. McFarland & Company, 2005.

External links
 
 
 

1931 films
1931 drama films
1930s English-language films
American drama films
Films directed by William A. O'Connor
American black-and-white films
1930s American films